Fouad Pasha Serageddin (2 November 1911 – 9 August 2000), was a leader of Egypt's Wafd Party.

When President Hosni Mubarak allowed the Wafd to emerge from a prolonged period of dormancy in 1984, Serageddin proved a skilful political operator given the limits imposed on a divided and decimated opposition, and made the Al-Wafd newspaper an instant success through its Asfoura (Sparrow) column exposés of corruption and mismanagement.

A minister by his early thirties, he held four portfolios in the 1940s, serving in the Wafd-led Government of 1950-52 as Minister of Interior and Minister of Finance. His political career was abruptly suspended as the Free Officers' coup neared. Put on trial, he was sentenced to 15 years' imprisonment but released two months later. Several periods of detention followed under Colonel Nasser.

Serageddin did not return to the political landscape until 1978, when President Anwar Sadat, attempting to reinvigorate party pluralism, likened him to Louis XIV coming back from the grave. Political turbulence ensued, however, and Serageddin was one of a number to be imprisoned in 1981 in the twilight of Sadat's rule.

The Wafd Party sprang from the delegation formed by the nationalist Saad Zaghloul in 1918 to demand complete independence from the British, and was officially founded a year later. Serageddin upheld the party's tradition for democracy, bisectarianism and liberalism, but in courting the Muslim Brotherhood was thought to have exceeded a remit to broaden its popular appeal.

He would later take credit for ordering police in Ismailia armed with rifles to engage in a futile battle of Ismailia against British troops using light artillery, but this merely precipitated the burning of Cairo a day later on 26 January 1952, and the Government's immediate dismissal. His political longevity typified Egypt's political ossification, and he was sometimes criticised for leading a party of the past rather than the future. However, the New Wafd Party survived as a significant opposition party, contributing to the Egyptian Revolution of 2011.

References

1911 births
2000 deaths
Wafd Party politicians
Interior Ministers of Egypt
Finance Ministers of Egypt
Egyptian pashas
20th-century  Egyptian  economists
20th-century Egyptian politicians